Melanie Bernier (born April 27, 1981) from Quebec is a Canadian ski mountaineer and member of the national selection.

Selected results 
 2010:
 7th, World Championship relay race (together with Julie Matteau and Billie Velisek)
 9th, World Championship team race (together with Julie Matteau)
 2011:
 5th, World Championship sprint
 9th, World Championship team race (together with Julie Matteau)
 9th, World Championship vertical, total ranking
 10th, World Championship single race
 2012:
 1st, North American Championship, sprint
 4th, North American Championship, individual
 4th, North American Championship, total ranking

References

External links 
 Melanie Bernier at SkiMountaineers.org

1981 births
Living people
Canadian female ski mountaineers
Sportspeople from Quebec
21st-century Canadian women